Laura Bannon (1895 – December 14, 1963) was an American teacher and artist, illustrator and author of children's literature.

Biography
Laura Bannon was born in 1895 in Acme, Michigan, the daughter of James William Bannon and Carrie Freeman Bannon. She received degrees from Michigan State Normal School (now Western Michigan University) and the School of the Art Institute of Chicago. She taught high school in Battle Creek, Michigan for two years, and later became director of the Chicago Art Institute's junior department.

Bannon received the Chicago Children's Reading Round Table Award for her career contributions to children's literature. She also received acclaim from the Society of Typographical Arts.

Bannon died on December 14, 1963.

Partial bibliography
Manuela's Birthday (1936)
Tales from a Finnish Tupa (1936) (illustrator)
Pecos Bill: The Greatest Cowboy of All Time (1937) (illustrator)
Gregorio and the White Llama (1941)
Patty Paints a Picture (1946)
The Wonderful Fashion Doll (1953)

References

External links 
 Laura Bannon Collection of Illustrations at Newberry Library

1895 births
1963 deaths
Artists from Chicago
American children's writers
Writers from Chicago